Arkhon Infaustus is a French blackened death metal band from Paris. They formed in 1997, are signed to Osmose Productions, and have released four albums to date.

History 

Arkon Infaustus was created in late 1997 by Dk Deviant, joined by Torturer. They first released an EP entitled In Sperma Infernum through Mordgrimm, which was limited to 666 copies. They then signed to Spikekult Records and released another EP entitled Dead Cunt Maniac in 2000. This got them signed to Osmose Productions. Their first album, Hell Injection, was released in 2001 and limited to 500 copies. After their second album, Filth Catalyst (2002), they toured with Mortician. They then went on to do a split with the black metal band Revenge, and toured in Europe with Vader.

In 2004 they released Perdition Insanabilis and toured Europe with Deicide, and again in 2005 with Belphegor and In Aeternum. In 2007, they released an EP, Annunciation, and an album, Orthodoxyn, and in April and May 2008 toured Europe with Angelcorpse.

In 2017, the band came back releasing an EP, Passing the Nekromanteion.

Musical style 
Arkhon Infaustus use distorted raspy vocals, double bass, and synthesizers to play a style of black/death metal similar to that of Angelcorpse. Their lyrics usually deal with Satanism, sex, anti-Christianity, and general acts of debauchery.

Members

Current members 
 Dk Deviant – bass, vocals (1997-)
Sylvain "Skvm" Butet – drums (2017-)

Former members 
Guillaume "666 Torturer" Warren – bass, vocals (1997–2009)
Yov "Hellblaster" – drums (1999–2002)
Damien "Toxik H." Guimard – guitar (2001–2009)
Jonathan "Azk.6" Boyer – drums (2002–2009)
I. Luciferia – guitar (2014–2015)

Discography 
 In Sperma Infernum (EP, Mordgrimm, 1998)
 Dead Cunt Maniac (EP, Spikekult, 2000)
 Hell Injection (CD, Osmose, 2001)
 Filth Catalyst (CD, Osmose, 2003)
 Arkhon Infaustus/Revenge (Split CD, Osmose, 2003)
 Perdition Insanabilis (CD, Osmose, 2004)
 Annunciation (EP, Osmose, 2007)
 Orthodoxyn (CD, Osmose, 2007)
 Passing The Nekromanteion (CD, LP, Les Acteurs De L'Ombre Productions, 2017)

References

External links 

 Arkhon Infaustus at Myspace
 [ Arkhon Infaustus] at AllMusic

French black metal musical groups
French death metal musical groups
Blackened death metal musical groups
Musical groups from Paris
Musical groups established in 1997
Musical quartets